Ectropina acidula is a moth of the family Gracillariidae. It is known from Bihar, India.

The wingspan is 6–6.2 mm.

The larvae feed on Phyllanthus emblica. They probably mine the leaves of their host plant.

References

Gracillariinae
Moths of Asia
Moths described in 1911